Apterocis is a genus of beetles in the family Ciidae, containing the following species:

 Apterocis ephistemoides (Sharp in Blackburn & Sharp, 1885)
 Apterocis hawaiiensis Perkins, 1900
 Apterocis hystrix Perkins, 1900
 Apterocis impunctatus Perkins, 1900
 Apterocis laiaiensis Perkins, 1900
 Apterocis minor Perkins, 1900
 Apterocis montanus Perkins, 1900
 Apterocis ornatipennis Perkins, 1900
 Apterocis rufonotatus Perkins, 1900
 Apterocis strigosus Perkins, 1900
 Apterocis subaeneus Perkins, 1900
 Apterocis vagepunctatus (Blackburn in Blackburn & Sharp, 1885)
 Apterocis variabilis Perkins, 1900
 Apterocis variegatus Perkins, 1900

References

Ciidae genera